Ciriatto is one of the Malebranche in Dante's Inferno, appearing in Cantos XXI, XXII and XXIII.

In Italian, Ciriatto's name means "swine" or "little pig" (-atto is a diminutive suffix for animals). This is reinforced when Ciriatto is referred to as "tusky" (Italian: sannuto; Canto XXI Verse 122).

Ciriatto is the main focus of a single triplet, where he pounces on Ciampolo, a grafter who is caught in their circle. He is quickly stopped by Barbariccia, who takes his own turn torturing the sinner. This continues the pattern of Dante introducing the ten demons in Canto XXI then mentioning them all exactly once in Canto XXII.

References 

Demons in the Divine Comedy